Clément Libertiaux (born 21 February 1998) is a Belgian professional footballer who plays as a goalkeeper for Belgian National Division 1 club RAAL La Louvière.

Professional career
On 27 June 2017, Libertiaux signed his first professional contract with Royal Excel Mouscron for 3 years. He made his professional debut in a 1-1 Belgian First Division A with Sint-Truidense V.V. on 2 December 2017. He made his debut at the age of 19 after the first keeper Logan Bailly tore his abductor muscle, and the second keeper Jean Butez suffered a concussion before the game.

On 24 December 2019 it was confirmed, that Libertiaux had joined La Louvière on loan for the rest of the season. In April 2020 the club announced, that they had signed the goalkeeper on a permanent deal from the upcoming season, where his deal with Mouscron also expired.

References

External links
 
 Sport.Be Profile 

1998 births
Living people
Sportspeople from Namur (city)
Belgian footballers
Royal Excel Mouscron players
RAAL La Louvière players
Belgian Pro League players
Belgian National Division 1 players
Association football goalkeepers
Footballers from Namur (province)